"Armageddon It" is a song by the English rock band Def Leppard from their 1987 album Hysteria. It was released as a single in 1988 and went to No. 3 in the United States, becoming their 3rd top 10 hit. It also reached the top 10 in Canada and New Zealand and the top 20 in Ireland and the United Kingdom.

The vocal style of the song is described as "T.Rex meets Eddie Cochran with backing vocals", according to lead singer Joe Elliott in the liner notes for Vault: Def Leppard Greatest Hits (1980-1995). There are two mixes of the song that appeared in the single: the "Atomic Mix", which is the album version, and the "Nuclear Mix", which is an extended version.

Music video
The video for the song was the second to feature Def Leppard in a live arena setting.  On 12–13 February 1988, the band recorded two shows at the McNichols Arena in Denver, Colorado for a future live film release. However, a month later, "Armageddon It" was set to be released as the sixth single off the popular Hysteria album and a promo video clip was urgently needed.

From the band's end, there was hesitation to film another concept video. Although they were happy with the results for "Hysteria" and "Animal", they were very unsatisfied with the way "Pour Some Sugar on Me" had turned out for its concept. Therefore, an idea was pitched to quickly create a video edited from the Denver footage. It was another hit in the UK, reaching the Top 20. Months later, it was released in the United States and was even more successful, reaching the Top 3. However, "Pour Some Sugar on Me" was the first song used there for the "live" concept (in fact, many of the scenes are the same in the two), but instead of filming a different video, slight changes were made using footage filmed in October at the Omni in Atlanta, Georgia.

Track listings
CD: Bludgeon Riffola / LEPCD4 (UK) / 870 239-2 (INT)
 "Armageddon It"
 "Ring of Fire"
 "Animal"
 "Pour Some Sugar on Me"

7-inch: Bludgeon Riffola / Vertigo / 872 692-7P (CANADA) / Picture Disc
 "Armageddon It"
 "Release Me"

7-inch: Bludgeon Riffola / Polygram Records / Mercury / 872 692-7 (INT)
 "Armageddon It"
 "Release Me"

Personnel
 Joe Elliott – lead vocals
 Steve Clark – lead guitar, backing vocals
 Phil Collen – rhythm guitar, ride-out guitar solo, backing vocals
 Rick Savage – bass, backing vocals 
 Rick Allen – drums, backing vocals

Charts

Weekly charts

Year-end charts

See also
List of glam metal albums and songs

References

1987 songs
1988 singles
Def Leppard songs
Mercury Records singles
Music videos directed by Wayne Isham
Song recordings produced by Robert John "Mutt" Lange
Songs written by Joe Elliott
Songs written by Phil Collen
Songs written by Rick Savage
Songs written by Robert John "Mutt" Lange